The Migratory Bird Conservation Act of 1929 of February 18, 1929, (also known as the "Norbeck-Andresen Act") created the United States Migratory Bird Conservation Commission (MBCC) to consider and approve any areas of land and/or water recommended by the Secretary of the Interior for purchase or rental by the U.S. Fish and Wildlife Service and to fix the price or prices at which such areas may be purchased or rented.

The Commission considered the establishment of new waterfowl refuges. While perhaps unimportant because of the Great Depression, the act was an important step for the conservation movement.

See also
Migratory Bird Treaty Act

United States federal environmental legislation
1929 in the environment
Bird migration